Georg Friedrich Kaulfuss (8 April 1786 – 9 December 1830) was a professor at Halle. He described the pteridophytes collected by Adelbert von Chamisso, and he named the fern Cibotium chamissoi after him. The genus Kaulfussia is named for Kaulfuss.

In 1816 he obtained his doctorate from the University of Halle, where in 1823 he became a full professor of botany.

Plants Named by Kaulfuss
More than 200 plant names were published by Kaulfuss. These include the genera:

Cochlidium 

Balantium 

Plant families named by Kaulfuss include:
Marattiaceae 
Cyatheaceae

Works by Kaulfuss
Kaulfuss, Georg Friedrich. Enumeratio Filicum. 1824.

References

Pteridologists
19th-century German botanists
1830 deaths
1786 births
Academic staff of the University of Halle
University of Halle alumni